The Life and Death of Harriett Frean' is a 1922 novel by English author May Sinclair.

Plot 
Harriett Frean is a woman so afraid of life that she will eventually talk herself out of living it. The novel follows Harriet as she is raised to be the ideal Victorian woman. Harriett is proud of her self-sacrifice (which she believes is the highest love of all) but when she falls in love with her best friend's fiance she is forced to question everything she thought she knew. Having decided not to follow her heart Harriett spends the rest of her life trying to convince herself that she has done the right thing. Described as a "small, perfect gem of a book" by author Jonathan Coe.

The history of the novel 

It was first published in 1922; The Life and Death of Harriett Frean is the only May Sinclair novel currently in print. It was republished  by Virago in 1980, by Penguin Books in 1986 and has been reprinted many times. It was also adapted into a BBC television show in 1986.

Notes

External links
 
  

1922 British novels
English novels
Novels set in London
Macmillan Publishers books